Barry Van Dyke (born July 31, 1951) is an American actor and the second son of actor and entertainer Dick Van Dyke and Margie Willett, and nephew of Jerry Van Dyke. He has often worked with his father. He is best known to audiences as Lieutenant Detective Steve Sloan, a homicide detective and the son of Dr. Mark Sloan (played by Dick Van Dyke) on Diagnosis: Murder. In the show, the characters' relatives were frequently played by real-life family members.

Biography
Barry Van Dyke was born in Atlanta, Georgia, the son of Dick Van Dyke (born 1925) and his first wife, Margie Willett (1926–2008).

Van Dyke's television debut was as Florian, a violin-toting nine-year-old in "The Talented Neighborhood" episode of The Dick Van Dyke Show alongside big brother Christian. However, his father advised him to wait before pursuing a show business career. Van Dyke later told a reporter, "He wanted me to have my childhood. He told me that if I still wanted to act after I graduated high school, then it would be OK."

Later, he worked as a gofer on his father's television series, The New Dick Van Dyke Show, which debuted in 1971 and aired until 1974. While working on that show, he secured a part as an extra.

He worked with his father again in the short-lived series The Van Dyke Show (which was canceled after six episodes in 1988) and then the long-running series Diagnosis: Murder, which aired from 1993 to 2001. In both series, he had major roles. He also wrote and directed several episodes of Diagnosis: Murder. After Diagnosis: Murder ended, Barry appeared in the Murder 101 television films, again alongside his father.

Barry Van Dyke also appeared in many other television shows over the course of his long career. His other television work includes a starring role in Galactica 1980 as Lieutenant Dillon, and appearances in Remington Steele, The Love Boat, Magnum, P.I., The Dukes of Hazzard, as Ace Combat Pilot and former M.I.A. soldier St. John Hawke in the final season of Airwolf, The A-Team, Gun Shy, Murder, She Wrote, Mork & Mindy, and The Redd Foxx Show.

Marriage and children
In 1974, he married Mary Carey; the couple have four children: Carey (born February 25, 1976), Shane (born August 28, 1979), Wes (born October 22, 1984), and Taryn (born June 1, 1986).

Filmography

References

External links
 
 Barry Van Dyke at Fandango
 Barry Van Dyke at Intelius
 Barry Van Dyke at TV.com 

1951 births
American male film actors
American male television actors
Male actors from Atlanta
20th-century American male actors
21st-century American male actors
Barry
Living people